Windermeria aitkeni (named after Windermere, British Columbia, Canada)   is a Precambrian organism from the Blueflower Formation of Sekwi Brook North, in the Northwest Territories of Canada. Only one specimen has been found. Windermeria is a small (16.4 × 7.9 mm) segmented elongated oval fossil with eight nearly equal-sized segments arranged transverse to medial furrow in opposite arrangement. Windermeria superficially resembles a diminutive Dickinsonia and as such is the only possible dickinsoniid proarticulatan known exclusively from outside of Australia and East Europe.

See also
 List of Ediacaran genera

References

External links
 Queen's University Department of Geological Sciences and Geological Engineering Museum archived from the original

Dipleurozoa
Ediacaran Canada
Fossils of Canada
Ediacaran life
Fossil taxa described in 1994